Chaiya Mitchai (Thai: เอ, ไชยา มิตรชัย) (born April 5, 1974) is a luk thung singer  with likay and drama actor from Thailand.

Life 
Mitchai born as Sayma Somboon (nicknamed A) in Wiset Chaichan, Ang Thong, central Thailand on April 5, 1974, to Somsak Jaikwang (ex-Likay actor and songwriter) and Duangduen Somboon (ex-Likay actress). He has a younger sister (Ann Mitchai), a younger brother (Mit Mitchai) and graduated with a Bachelor of Law from Ramkhamhaeng University.

His stage name comes from a combination of the names of two legendary Thai stars, namely Mitr Chaibancha and Chaiya Suriyu.

He became famous for his songs titled Gra-tong long tang (กระทงหลงทาง) with Mai tham-mada (ไม่ธรรมดา) in 1997.

Discography 
 Gam-praa aa-won กำพร้าอาวรณ์
 Tayp gaan gu-son เทปการกุศล
 Jao baao som-mut เจ้าบ่าวสมมุติ
 Gra-tom saao mern กระท่อมสาวเมิน
 Pua nok ban-chee ผัวนอกบัญชี
 Long rak-dok faa หลงรักดอกฟ้า
 Rim grai-raat ริมไกรราศ
 Suay tee sut สวยที่สุด
 Man man kem kem มันๆ เค็มๆ
 Moo  mee dtae pak หมูหนีมีแต่ผัก
 Tay pee chaai-klong เทพีชายคลอง
 Dton wai bpai baan rao ต้อนไว้ไปบ้านเรา
 Gra-tong long taang กระทงหลงทาง
 Look tòok leum ลูกถูกลืม
 Playng rak jaak chaiya เพลงรักจากไชยา
 Chaiya laa-buat ไชยาลาบวช
 San-yaa · 2 · bpee สัญญา 2 ปี
 Gra-tong teung fang กระทงถึงฝั่ง
 Moo · Moo · Moo หมู หมู หมู
 OST of Theppabud kon dtaa ngon เพลงประกอบละคร เทพบุตรขนตางอน
 Jai pee yang mee rak ใจพี่ยังมีรัก
 Fah Kieng Dao ฟ้าเคียงดาว
 OST of Poo-Yai Hed VS Gum-Nun Hoi เพลงประกอบละคร ผู้ใหญ่เห็ด Vs กำนันหอย
 Hua bun dai mai haeng หัวบันไดไม่แห้ง Vol. 1
 OST of Theppabud Chood Win เพลงประกอบละคร เทพบุตรชุดวิน
 Sa-wan lom prom pi-raam สวรรค์ล่มพหรมพิราม  (New Album Coming Soon!)

Dramas 
Jao Chai Noy(เจ้าชายน้อย)(child)
Pa Yak Song Paen Din(พยัคฆ์สองแผ่นดิน)(child)
Nai Hoy Tamil(นายฮ้อยทมิฬ) (Ch7-2001)
Thep Pa Butr Khon Ta Ngorn(เทพบุตรขนตางอน) (with Ao Petchrada) (Ch3-2004)
Luk Tee Tuk Lerm (ลูกที่ถูกลืม) (Ch7-1998)
Kaew Nar Mar(แก้วหน้าม้า) (Ch7-2004)
Pi Goon Tong (พิกุลทอง) (Ch7)
Sa Pai Hai Soh (สะใภ้ไฮโซ) (Ch5-2002)
Cha Cha Cha Thah Ruk (ชะชะช่าท้ารัก) (Ch7)
Mat Joo Raat Dting Dtong (มัจจุราชติ๊งต๊อง)(with Kob Suvanant)(Ch7)
Leuat Sam See (เลือดสามสี)(with Ao Petchrada) (Ch3-2005)
Roi Tai(รอยไถ) (Ch7-2002)
Poo Yai Hed VS. Kamnun Hoi(ผู้ใหญ่เห็ด VS กำนันหอย) (with Tanyares)(Ch3-2006)
Por Malai Rimtang(พ่อมาลัยริมทาง) (with Donut Manasnan) (Ch3-2009)
Theppabut Chood Win(เทพบุตรชุดวิน) (with Namfon Patcharin) (Ch3-2009)
Poo Yai Baan Na Ya (ผู้ใหญ่บ้านนะยะ)(2010)
Pom Mai Yaak Bpen Saai Lap (ผมไม่อยากเป็นสายลับ) (with Vicky Sunisa) (Ch3-2010)(upcoming)
Pun Tai Norrasing (พันท้ายนรสิงห์) (Ch3-2011)

Likay 
Poo Chanah Sib Tid (Part look ruam nom) ผู้ชนะสิบทิศ ตอน ลูกร่วมนม
Kaew Na Mah แก้วหน้าม้า
Sood kaen Saen ruk สุดแค้น แสนรัก
Mae Sord Sa-uern  แมสอดสะอื่น
Sood Tang Ruk สุดทางรัก
Look Nai Rong Chang ลูกในโรงช้าง(Recommend)
3 Kler Jer Ruk 3 3 เกลอเจอรัก
Pun Tai Norrasing พันท้ายนรสิงห์
Ror Khun Mhark รอขันหมาก
Fai Lhuan Vol.1&2 ฝายหลวง ตอน 1&2(shoot @STUDIO บ้าน 400)
Mae Nark Prakanong Vol.1&2 แม่นาคพระโขนง ตอน 1&2(Eng Sub)(shoot @STUDIO บ้าน 400)
Sai Gern Gae สายเกินแก้
Jorm Jai Chaiyagarn จอมใจชัยกานต์
Yhod Lued Chai Sabai หยดเลือดชายสไบ
Krai Kah Maharaj ใครฆ่ามหาราช
Khun Chang Khun Paen ขุนช้างขุนแผน
Esao Supun อีสาวสุพรรณ
Happy Birthday Live Concert Vol.1(A)
Happy Birthday Live Concert Vol.2(Ann)
pra a-pai ma-nee  พระอภัยมณี ตอนที่ 1+2 (N'Mit)(Eng Sub)
Gumprah Roang Hai  กำพร้าร้องไห้(childhood)[Special recommend!!!!!!](รางวัลชนะเลิศ ลิเกประชัน 6 คณะ)
See Darb Parb Pairee สี่ดาบปราบไพรี

Movies 
The Troop Of Ghost – Likay เดอะโกร๋น ก๊วน กวน ผี – พระเอกลิเก(2004)
Dark Water – Likay เวิ้งปีศาจ – พระเอกลิเก(2007)
ผู้ใหญ่บ้านนะยะ (Poo Yai Ban Na Ya) – Channel 3 TV Movie (2010)

Book
Pocket book : Likay ... Chewit published in May 2006

MC
 Television 
 2022 : รายการ ครัวลั่นทุ่ง ศึกเชฟสะท้านทุ่ง ทุกวันเสาร์ เวลา 10.10 น. On Air Channel 8 เริ่มวันเสาร์ที่ 5 กุมภาพันธ์ 2565 with MC Kohtee Aramboy, ChefKent-Vatcharavee Visetpohchanatip

 Online

References

External links
 A Mitchai (Thailand) Co. Ltd
  CHAIYA FAN CLUB
 Chaiya Mitchai@Hi5
 Ann Mitchai@Hi5
 Mit Mitchai@Hi5
 Gino@Hi5
 A&Ann Mitchai Channel@YouTube

Chaiya Mitchai
Chaiya Mitchai
Chaiya Mitchai
1974 births
Living people
Chaiya Mitchai
Chaiya Mitchai
Chaiya Mitchai
Thai television personalities
Chaiya Mitchai